
This is a list of the National Register of Historic Places listings in west Davenport, Iowa.  This is intended to be a complete list of the properties and districts on the National Register of Historic Places in west Davenport, Iowa, United States.  West Davenport is defined as being all of the city west of Marquette Street and between Marquette and Brady Streets (U.S. Route 61 and north of 5th Street.  The locations of National Register properties and districts may be seen in an online map.

There are 252 properties and districts listed on the National Register in Davenport.  West Davenport includes 109 of these properties and districts; the city's remaining properties and districts are listed elsewhere.  Many of these properties were included in a multiple property submission; they are marked below as "Davenport MRA."  Another property was once listed but has been removed.

Current listings

|}

Former listings

|}

See also
 List of National Historic Landmarks in Iowa
 National Register of Historic Places listings in Iowa

References

Buildings and structures in Davenport, Iowa